Miles Harvey (born 28 May 1946) is a South African cricketer. He played in fifteen first-class and two List A matches for Border from 1968/69 to 1972/73.

See also
 List of Border representative cricketers

References

External links
 

1946 births
Living people
South African cricketers
Border cricketers
Cricketers from Durban